Last Days and Time is the third studio album by American band Earth, Wind & Fire, released in October 1972 on Columbia Records. The album rose to No. 15 on the US Billboard Top Soul Albums chart and No. 9 on the UK Blues & Soul Top British Soul Albums chart.

Overview 
Last Days and Time was produced by Joe Wissert and recorded at Sunset Sound Studios in Hollywood, California.

The album includes covers of Bread's "Make It with You" and Pete Seeger's "Where Have All The Flowers Gone".

Singles
The song, "Mom", reached No. 39 on the Cashbox Top R&B Singles chart.

Samples
"Saxophone Interlude" was sampled by Digable Planets on the song "Swoon Units" from their album Reachin' (A New Refutation of Time and Space). "Remember the Children" was also sampled by DJ Quik on the song "America'z Most Complete Artist" from his 1992 album Way 2 Fonky.

Critical reception
Producer Jimmy Jam became a fan of EWF after listening to Last Days and Time. Hip Hop artist Nas was also inspired by the LP's cover art while British singer Gabrielle named the album as one of her favorites.

Variety called the album "pulsating". William Ruhlmann of Allmusic gave a three out of five star rating and proclaimed "Earth, Wind & Fire were nothing if not ambitious, and by the time of their third album they had forged an individual sound by absorbing nearly everything that had gone before them in the previous ten years. It was as if they were trying to encapsulate every eclectic foray pursued by Motown, from catchy, rhythmic pop to churning funk, and even from Stevie Wonder singing borrowed folk songs like "Blowin' in the Wind" (here, Philip Bailey did "Where Have All the Flowers Gone") to the schmaltzy, string-filled pop that spelled legitimacy to Motown. Not only that, they wanted to incorporate Sly & the Family Stone's horn-filled, gutbucket R&B and some of the fusion style of Weather Report. On Last Days and Time, they succeeded in pulling all that into their orbit". Billboard noted that "Earth, Wind & Fire's dynamic soul rock style is the main ingredients" of the album. Paul Sexton of Record Mirror in a 1979 review gave a 3 out of 5 stars rating and wrote "Musical historians and EW&F fans alike will welcome the release, for the first time in this country, of EW&F's first CBS album from 1973." Sexton added "Maurice White was still the wallah, even in those days, but the band hadn't really established their sound, although the material they used was not enormously different. The lush production, and White's domination of the vocals are not there, and there's greater reliance on other people's material. Such as, curiously enough David Gates "Make It With You" and even more unlikely, Pete Seeger's "Where Have All The Flowers Gone". White wrote or co-wrote four numbers here including the instrumental "Power" and "Mom" one of the highlights." Edward Hill of the Plain Dealer said "Released a year after What's Going On, the disc used jazz-like instrumental experimentation expanding on Gaye's vision of the coming desolation." Ovid Goode Jr. of The Los Angeles Daily News declared "There are many groups around today capitalizing on the rock-jazz sound which has become so popular. The only problem is that many of the groups are beginning to sound alike, both in their styles and in their material. However, take the same two ingredients, rock and jazz, add a pound of soul and a whole new sound is born, reflected in the music of Earth, Wind and Fire. The group's first album on Columbia, Last Days and Time, sprouts forth with a fresh sound that sets it apart from many of the ho-hum aggregations around today. The album consists of eight moving tunes".

Track listing

Personnel 
 Maurice White – vocals, drums, kalimba
 Verdine White – vocals, bass, percussion
 Philip Bailey – vocals, congas, percussion
 Jessica Cleaves – vocals
 Roland Bautista – acoustic and electric guitars
 Larry Dunn – piano, organ, clavinet
 Ronnie Laws – flute, soprano and tenor saxophones
 Ralph Johnson – drums, percussion

Production
 Producer – Joe Wissert
 Engineers – Kent Nebergall and Al Schmitt
 Remix – Al Schmitt
 Mastered by Johnny Golden and Bob MacCloud Jr. at Artisan Sound Recorders (Hollywood, CA).
 Design – Mati Klarwein
 Photography – Roland Charles

Charts
Album 

Singles

References

Earth, Wind & Fire albums
1972 albums
Albums produced by Joe Wissert
Columbia Records albums
Albums with cover art by Mati Klarwein
Albums recorded at Sunset Sound Recorders